The Drama Desk Award for Outstanding Actress in a Play is an annual award presented by Drama Desk in recognition of achievements in the theatre among Broadway, Off Broadway and Off-Off Broadway productions. The awards were established in 1955, with acting awards being given without making distinctions between roles in plays and musicals, or actors and actresses. The new award categories were later created in the 1975 ceremony.

Winners and nominees

1970s

1980s

1990s

2000s

2010s

2020s

See also
 Laurence Olivier Award for Best Actress
 Tony Award for Best Performance by a Leading Actress in a Play

References

External links
 Drama Desk official website

Play Actress
Awards for actresses
Theatre acting awards